The grey bunting (Emberiza variabilis) is a species of bird in the family Emberizidae.

It breeds in southern Kamchatka, Sakhalin, Kuril Islands and northern Japan, it migrates to southern Japan and the Nansei archipelago. Its natural habitats are boreal forests and temperate forests.

Gallery

References

grey bunting
Birds of North Asia
Birds of Japan
grey bunting
Taxonomy articles created by Polbot